Elijah Teague Anderson House is a historic home located at Republic, Greene County, Missouri. It was built in 1885, and is a two-story, vernacular Queen Anne style weatherboarded frame dwelling. It has a fieldstone foundation and steeply pitched intersecting gable roof.  It features a Stick Style overlay and fishscale shingles.

It was listed on the National Register of Historic Places in 1980.

References

Houses on the National Register of Historic Places in Missouri
Queen Anne architecture in Missouri
Houses completed in 1885
Buildings and structures in Greene County, Missouri
National Register of Historic Places in Greene County, Missouri